
Otwock County is a unit of territorial administration and local government (powiat) in Masovian Voivodeship, east-central Poland. It came into being on January 1, 1999, as a result of the Polish local government reforms passed in 1998.

As of 2019 its total population is 124,241, out of which the population of Otwock is 44,827, that of Józefów is 20,698, that of Karczew is 9,856, and the rural population is 48,860.

Neighbouring counties
Otwock County is bordered by Mińsk County to the east, Garwolin County to the south-east, Grójec County to the south-west, and Piaseczno County and the city of Warsaw to the west.

Administrative division
The county is subdivided into eight gminas (two urban, one urban-rural and five rural). These are listed in the following table, in descending order of population.

See also
 Świdermajer, the characteristic style of architecture in the area

References

 
Otwock